This is a complete list of khans of the Ulus of Jochi, better known by its later Russian designation as the Golden Horde, in its right (west) wing and left (east) wing divisions known problematically as the Blue Horde and White Horde, and of its main successor state during a period of disintegration, known as the Great Horde. Khans of the Blue Horde are listed as the principal rulers of the Golden Horde, although many late rulers of the Golden Horde originated from the subordinate White Horde. Following the general convention, the list encompasses the period from the death of Genghis Khan in 1227 to the sack of Sarai by the Crimean Khanate in 1502. The chronological and genealogical information is often incomplete and contradictory; annotation can be found in the secondary lists in the second part of the article, and in the individual articles on specific monarchs.

Secondary list with short biographies

The following is a detailed annotated list intended mainly as an index to the linked articles. It is based primarily on Baumer 2016, Gaev 2002, Grigor'ev 1983, Howorth 1880, Počekaev 2010, and Sabitov 2008 and 2014. Name forms, encountered in much variation and inconsistency, are standardized on the basis of Biran 1997 and Bosworth 1996.

Western half of the Golden Horde (1226–1362)
1 Chinggis Khan 1206–1227, founded Mongol empire, got about as far as the Volga
 The generals Subutai and Jebe 1219–1223 led raid clockwise around the Caspian, defeated Rus at Battle of Kalka River
2 Jochi c. 1208–1227, 1st son of Genghis Khan (1), given west, predeceased father, ancestor of the khans of the Golden Horde.
3 Batu Khan 28Y, 1227–1255, son of Jochi (2), 1236–42 conquered Russia and Ukraine, c 1250 founded capital Sarai on lower Volga.
3a Orda Khan, elder brother of Batu (3), held east, see A below.
3b Shiban ?–?, younger brother of Batu (3), held area north of Aral/Caspian between Batu and Orda, descendants (Shaybanids) important.
3c Tuqa-Timur ?–?, younger brother of Batu (3), descendants (Tuqa-Timurids) important.
4 Sartaq Khan 1Y, 1256-1257, son of Batu (3), most of short reign spent travelling to great khan in Mongolia.
5 Ulaghchi, 1257, brother (less likely son) of Sartaq (4), 10 years old.
6 Berke 9Y, 1257–1266, younger brother of Batu (3), clashed with Hulagu Khan of Persia and allied with Mamluks, died while fighting Hulagu's son, first Muslim khan but did not enforce conversion to Islam.
7 Möngke Temür 14Y, 1266–1280, son of Toghan, son of Batu (3), non-Muslim, established trade with Genoese at Kaffa; effectively autonomous from the great khan Qubilai from 1269.
7a Nogai Khan c. 1266–1299, son of Bo'al, son of Tatar, 7th son of Jochi (2); under Batu guarded western frontier, invaded Poland, helped Berke (6) fight Hulagu, 1265 invaded Balkans, 1266 de facto ruler west of the Dnieper, c. 1280 killed Bulgarian emperor, 1285 he and Talabuga invaded Hungary, 1287 raided Poland, then Circassia, killed in battle by Toqta (10), son fled to Bulgaria, sometimes considered its emperor.
8 Töde Möngke 7Y, 1280–1287, brother of Mengu-Timur (7), pious Muslim, weak, removed by Nogai.
9 Töle Buqa 4Y, 1287–1291, son of Tartu, the brother of Mengu-Timur (7), enthroned by Nogai and fought alongside him, began to assert himself so removed, then killed by Nogai or Toqta (10).
10 Toqta 23Y, 1291–1312, the son of Mengu-Timur (7), installed by Nogai, 1300 killed Nogai, quarreled with Genoese at Kaffa.
11 Öz Beg 27Y, 1314–1341, son of Toghrilcha, the son of Mengu-Timur (7), first to actively support Islam, fought and made peace with Persia, appointed Ivan Kalita chief tax collector.
12 Tīnī Beg 1Y, 1341–1342,  son of Öz Beg (11), killed by Jani Beg (13).
13 Jānī Beg 15Y, 1342–1357, brother of Tini Beg (12), lost land in the west, took Tabriz, his 1347 siege of Kaffa spread the black death to Europe.
The Black Death would have impacted the steppe about this time, but there are few records.
14 Berdi Beg 2Y, 1357–1359, son and possibly murderer of Jānī Beg (13), eliminated his close kinsmen, murdered? End of the Line of Batu (3).
15 Qulpa 1Y, 1359–1360, possibly pretended son of Jānī Beg (13), murdered.
16 Nawrūz Beg (= ? Bazarchi) 1360 pretended son of Öz Beg (11) or Jānī Beg (13), killed.
17 Khiḍr Khan, 1360-1361, son of Mangqutay, the son of Tula-Buqa, the son of Qadaq, the son Shiban (3b), murdered.
18 Tīmūr Khwāja, 1361, son and murderer of Khiḍr Khan (17), killed.
 "Great Disorder" 1361–1380, period of chronic civil war among contending factions. According to Baumer between Berdi Beg and Tokhtamiysh there were 19 khans, at least 8 puppets of Mamai. In reality, only 4 rulers were Mamai's protégés.
 Warlord Mamai 1361–1380/1381 started in Crimea, supported various khans, occasionally asserting control over capital Sarai, lost territory to Lithuania, Moscow stopped paying tribute, 1380 defeated by Russians at the Battle of Kulikovo, same year defeated by Tokhtamysh, fled to the Crimea and was eventually eliminated by Tokhtamysh's agents.
19 Ordu Malik, 1361, probably son of Īl-Tūtār, the son of Dānishmand, the son of Bayan, the son of Tuqa-Timur (3c); murdered.
20 Kildi Beg, 1361-1362, pretended son of Jānī Beg (13); killed.

"Sarai Horde" (Right bank of the Volga) (1362–1399)
(Chronology according to Grigor'ev 1983)
21G ʿAbdallāh = 21M, 1362, probably the son of Minkasar, the son of Abay, the son of Kay-Timur, the son of Tuqa-Timur (3c); protégé of Mamai, expelled.
22G Murād, 1362, brother of Khiḍr Khan (17), expelled (rival khan at Gülistan 1361-1364).
23G Khayr Pūlād or Mīr Pūlād, 1362-1364, son of Ming-Timur, the son of Badaqul, the son of Jochi-Buqa, the son of Bahadur, the son of Shiban (3b); expelled? (rival khan at Gülistan as Pūlād Khwāja 1364-1367?).
24G ʿAzīz Shaykh, 1364-1367, probably son of Tun Khwāja, the son of Baliq, the son of Buralday, the son of Qutluq-Timur, the son of Salghan, the son of Shiban (3b); murdered.
25G ʿAbdallāh = 21M, 1367-1368, restored as protégé of Mamai, expelled
26G Ūljāy Tīmūr or Pūlād Tīmūr, 1368, probably = Tīmūr Beg, son of Qutluq Tīmūr, the son of Numqan, the son of Abay, the son of Kay-Timur, the son of Tuqa-Timur (3c); protégé of Ḥājjī Cherkes of Astrakhan, expelled.
27G Ḥasan Beg, 1368-1369, son of Beg-Qundi, the brother of Khayr Pūlād (23G), expelled, killed?.
28G ʿAbdallāh = 21M, 1369-1370, restored protégé of Mamai
29G Tūlūn Beg Khānum, 1370-1371, probably daughter of Berdi Beg (14) and wife of Mamai, his protégé at Sarai.
30G Muḥammad-Sulṭān = 22M, 1371-1373, probably son of ʿAbdallāh (21/25/28G), protégé of Mamai, expelled.
31G Urus Khan, 1373, = I below, son of Bādāq, the son of Tīmūr Khwāja, the son of Tāqtāq, the 2nd son of Achiq, the son of Urungbāsh (Urung-Timur), the 3rd son of Tuqa-Timur (3c); not a descendant of Orda (3a), as claimed in older scholarship and its derivatives; expelled.
32G Cherkes Beg, 1373-1374, pretended son of Jānī Beg (13), protégé of or identical with Ḥājjī Cherkes of Astrakhan, expelled.
33G Īl Beg, 1374, brother of Khayr Pūlād (23G).
34G Muḥammad-Sulṭān = 22M, 1374, restored as protégé of Mamai, expelled.
35G Urus Khan, 1374-1375 = I below, restored, expelled, died 1377.
36G Qāghān Beg, 1375-1377, son of Īl Beg (33G), abdicated.
37G ʿArab Shāh, 1377-1380, son of Khayr Pūlād (23G), abdicated.
Tokhtamysh, 1380–1399, = L below, son of Tuy Khwāja, the son of Qutluq Khwāja, the son of Kuyuchak, the son of Saricha, the son of Ūrungbāsh (Urung-Timur), the 3rd son of Tuqa-Timur (3c); came from east and united two halves of the Horde, originally a protégé of Timur (Tamerlane), later fell out with him and was driven out by Edigu (who now had Timur's support).

(Alternative chronology according to Sidorenko 2000)
21S Khayr Pūlād or Mīr Pūlād, 1362-1364, descendant of Shiban (3b) as above; expelled? (possibly rival khan at Gülistan as Pūlād Khwāja 1364?).
22S ʿAbdallāh, 1362-1365, probably descendant of Tuqa-Timur (3c), as above; protégé of Mamai, expelled.
23S ʿAzīz Shaykh, 1365-1367, probably descendant of Shiban (3b), as above; murdered (earlier rival khan at Gülistan 1364-1365).
24S Ūljāy Tīmūr or Pūlād Tīmūr, 1367, probably descendant of Tuqa-Timur (3c), as above.
 Following this, Sidorenko 2000 does not provide a continuous sequence of khans, since he limits his analysis to explicitly labeled coinage; he dates Tulun Beg Khanum to 1371/1372, Īl Beg to 1373/1374 (at Saray-Jük), Cherkes Beg to 1374/1375 (at Astrakhan), and then Qāghān Beg 1375-1377 and ʿArab Shāh 1377-1380, as above.

"Mamai's Horde" (Left bank of the Volga) (1362–1380)
21M ʿAbdallāh = 21/25/28G, 1362-1370, probably descendant of Tuqa-Timur (3c), as above; protégé of Mamai.
22M Muḥammad-Sulṭān = 30/34G; 1370-1379, probably son of ʿAbdallāh (21M); protégé of Mamai, murdered by him?
23M Tūlāk, 1379-1380, probably son of Tughluq Khwāja, the brother of ʿAbdallāh (21M); protégé of Mamai, killed at the Battle of Kulikovo?
 In older scholarship and its derivatives Muḥammad-Sulṭān and Tūlāk were erroneously treated as single individual, supposedly named Muḥammad-Būlāq; the distinction between them is established by Sidorenko 2000: 278-280, Gaev 2002: 23-25, and others.

Eastern half of the Golden Horde (1227–1380)
Between 1242 and 1380 the eastern and western halves of the horde were generally separate, the dividing line being somewhere north of the Caspian, perhaps the Ural. The relation between the two is not always clear, but the rulers of the Eastern half generally recognized the superior authority of those of the Western half. In the late 14th century, the Eastern half's rulers I. and L. attempted, at times successfully, to take over the Western half. The western khans had a capital at Sarai on the lower Volga while the eastern khans had capitals or winter camps on the Syr Darya, especially Sighnaq. Most rulers of the Eastern half are poorly documented, and historiography still largely relies on the treatment by Hammer-Purgstall 1840, who had access to what are now considered unreliable sources, like versions of the account of Muʿīn-ad-Dīn Naṭanzī (earlier known as the "Anonymous of Iskandar"). What became the traditional account, therefore, relies on Naṭanzī and his derivatives to construct (through additional rationalization) a continuous succession of khans from Orda (3a/A) to Urus Khan (I) and Tokhtamysh (L). While it is clear that the traditional chronology and genealogy are very flawed, they have enjoyed a lasting and pervasive influence in historiography, appearing even in recent publications, such as Bosworth 1996 and Baumer 2016. For discussion, see Vásáry 2009.

(Chronology and genealogy according to Hammer-Purgstall 1840)
A Orda Khan 28Y, c1227–1251, held East under his younger brother Batu (3), who ruled West, also general in western campaigns
B Qun Quran 29Y, 1251–c. 1280,  fourth son of Orda (A), little information (Baumer has Qongqiran >1255-<77)
C Köchü 22Y, c1280–1302  grandson of Orda (A), peaceful reign (Baumer: Qonichi c1277-<1299)
D Bayan 7Y, 1302–09,  son of Köchü (C), fought his cousin Kobluk/Kupalak who allied with Kaidu to the east (Baumer has <1299-<1312)
E Sasibuqa 6Y, 1309–15, son of Bayan (D), resisted Uzbeg Khan (11 above). (Baumer has Sasi Buqa <1312–1320/21)
F Ebisan 5Y, 1310/15–1320, son of Sasibuqa (E), probably gained land in southeast (Otrar) recognized overlordship of Uzbek (Baumer has Izran 1320/21–?) 
G Mubārak Khwāja 24Y, 1320–44,  brother of Ilbasan (F), little information (Baumer has ?–1344)
H Chimtay 16Y, 1344–1360, son of Ilbasan (F), little information (Baumer: 1344?–61)
The Black Death would have hit the steppe about this time, but there are few records.
I Urus Khan 15Y, 1361–1376,  son of Chimtay (H); (supposedly) uncle of Tokhtamysh (L); fought Tokhtamysh and Tamerlane,  1373 and 1374-1375 briefly held Western wing of the Golden Horde (Baumer:1361–74/75)
J Toqtaqiya 0Y, 1377, son of Urus (I), two-month reign, Baumer has him defeated by Tokhtamysh
K Tīmūr Malik 1Y, 1377–78, son of Urus (I), killed by Tokhtamysh (L).  
L Tokhtamysh 21Y, 1378–1395, son of Tuy Khwāja, (supposedly) the brother of Urus (I); a great man but more warlord than ruler, rebelled against his uncle Urus (I), fled to Tamerlane who in 1378 made him khan of the Horde, 1380 crossed Volga and defeated Mamai joining the two halves of the Golden Horde, burned Moscow to avenge Mamai's defeat at Kulikovo, broke with Tamerlane, captured Tabriz and withdrew, Tamerlane defeated him on the Volga in 1391 and on the Terek in 1395 and razed his cities north of the Caspian, fled to Lithuania, defeated by Tamerlane's general Edigu, fled to Siberia and was killed by Edigu's men.

(Revised chronology and genealogy according to Vásáry 2009)

Driven by a better understanding of the coinage of Mubārak Khwāja (issued in 1366-1368, not, as previously assumed, 40 or 30 years earlier), of Naṭanzī's limitations as a source on the subject, and of more reliable sources on the chronology and genealogy of Mongol rulers, Vásáry 2009 proposed the following reconstruction, some of it already anticipated by, e.g., Gaev 2002.
V1 Orda, 1st son of Jochi (2)
V2 Qongkiran, 4th son of Orda (V1)
V3 Qonichi, 1st son of Sartaqtay, the 1st son of Orda (V1)
V4 Bayan, 1st son of Qonichi (V3)
V5 Sasi-Buqa, c. 1310-1320/1321, 2nd son of Bayan (V4)
V6 Erzen, 1320/1321-1344/1345, son of Sasi-Buqa (V5)
V7 Chimtay, 1344/1345-1360/1361, son of Erzen (V6)
V8 Qara Nogai, 1360/1361-1363, 2nd son of Sasi, the 1st son of Toqanchar, the 1st son of Bay-Timur, the 1st son of Tuqa-Timur (3c), the 13th son of Jochi (2)
V9 Tughluq Timur, 1363-?, brother, as the 1st son of Sasi
V10 Mubārak Khwāja, ?-1369, cousin, as the 1st son of Boz Qulaq, the 2nd son of Toqanchar
V11 Qutluq Khwāja, 1369, cousin, as the 3rd son of Sasi
V12 Urus Khan, 1369-1377, son of Badiq, descendant of Tuqa-Timur (3c)

(Revised chronology and genealogy according to Sabitov 2014)

Sabitov 2014 likewise established a substantial revision to the list of rulers of the Eastern half of the Golden Horde, based on the Muʿizz al-ansāb, the Tawārīḫ-i guzīdah-i nuṣrat-nāmah, and the Čingīz-Nāmah. Unlike Vásáry, Sabitov did not attempt to continue a succession of khans descended from Orda beyond what was verifiable from reliable sources, and he showed that Orda's lineage lost its authority by 1330, when Öz Beg Khan of the Western half appointed his own non-Jochid governor over the Eastern half, a member of the Kiyat clan, and the Eastern half had khans of its own again only after 1360. The list after 1330 follows Gaev 2002: 10-15 and Sabitov 2008: 286.
S1 Orda 1227-1252/1253, 1st son of Jochi (2).
S2 Qongkiran, 1252/3-?, 4th son of Orda (S1).
S3 Qutuqu, ruling in 1262/1263, 6th son of Orda (S1).
S4 Tīmūr-Buqa, son of Qutuqu (S3)
S5 Qonichi, by the 1280s-1301/1302, 1st son of Sartaqtay, the 1st son of Orda (S1).
S6 Kubluk, 1301/1302, 1st son of Tīmūr-Buqa (S4), killed.
S7 Bayan, 1301/1302-1308/1309, 1st son of Qonichi (S5).
S8 Mangitay, 1308/1309-1320/1321, 4th son of Qonichi (S5).
S8a Kushtay, 1308/1309, son of Kubluk, rival khan
S9 Kalak, 1320/1321-1328/1330, son of Mangitay (S8)
S10 Kiyat governor Isatay, by 1330, appointed by Öz Beg Khan (11).
S11 Kiyat governor Jir-Qutlu, son of Isatay (S10), murdered by the future Urus Khan (S17).
S12 Kiyat governor Tingiz-Buqa, 1357-1360, son of Jir-Qutlu (S11), murdered by Qara Nogai (S13).
S13 Qara Nogai, 1360-1363, 2nd son of Sasi, the 1st son of Toqanchar, the 1st son of Bay-Timur, the 1st son of Tuqa-Timur (3c), the 13th son of Jochi (2); reasserted the autonomy of the Eastern half under khans of its own.
S14 Tughluq Tīmūr, 1363-?, nephew, as the son of Bujqaq, the 4th son of Sasi.
S15 Mubārak Khwāja, ?-1369, cousin, as the 1st son of Boz Qulaq, the 2nd son of Toqanchar.
S16 Qutluq Khwāja, 1369, cousin, as the 3rd son of Sasi.
S17 Urus Khan, 1369-1377, son of Bādāq, the son of Tīmūr Khwāja, the son of Tāqtāq, the 2nd son of Achiq, the son of Urungbāsh (Urung-Timur), the 3rd son of Tuqa-Timur (3c).
S18 Toqtaqiya, 1377, 2nd son of Urus, for 2 months.
S19 Tīmūr Malik, 1377-1379, 3rd son of Urus.
S20 Tokhtamysh, 1379-1395, son of Tuy Khwāja, the son of Qutluq Khwāja, the son of Kuyuchak, the son of Saricha, the son of Urungbāsh (Urung-Timur), the 3rd son of Tuqa-Timur (3c). His conquest of Sarai in 1380 and elimination of Mamai in 1380/1381 led to a temporary reunification and relative stabilization of the Golden Horde.

After Tokhtamysh (1380–1502)
Following Tokhtamysh there was no longer a clear distinction between east and west. For the first twenty years power was held by descendants of Urus Khan and Tohktamysh and by the warlord Edigu. There was then a confused period, followed by several long reigns. The last khan was deposed in 1502. The Golden horde broke up as follows: before 1400: Lithuania expanded as far east as Kiev, ?: Kursk as Lithuanian vassal, c 1430: land east of the Ural held by Abul Khayr, 1438: Kazan (by T11), 1449: Crimea (family of 3c), 1452: Kasimov as Russian vassal (family of 3c), 1465: Kazakh khanate (sons of T12), 1466: Astrakhan (T15), 1480: Russia, before 1490?: Sibir. The steppe nomads then became organized as the Nogai Horde.
T1 Tokhtamysh, 1380-1397 = L/S20 above, son of Tuy Khwāja, the son of Qutluq Khwāja, the son of Kuyuchak, the son of Saricha, the son of Ūrungbāsh (Urung-Timur), the 3rd son of Tuqa-Timur (3c).
Warlord Edigu c. 1396–1410 ruled Volga-Ural area, 1399 defeated T1, 1406 his men killed T1, 1407 raided Volga Bulgaria, 1408 raided Russia, 1410 dethroned, fled east, returned to Serai, 1419 mortally wounded against Qādir Berdi (T17). According to Baumer in 1410 he was driven out by one of his sons after which 9 khans followed in 9 years.
T1a Quyurchuq, 1395-1397, son of Urus Khan (I/S17).
T1b Tāsh-Tīmūr, 1395-1396, son of Jansa, the son of Tūlāk-Tīmūr, the son of Kuyunchak, the son of Saricha, the son of Urung-Timur, the son of Tuqa-Timur (3c); rival khan in the Crimea.
T2 Tīmūr Qutluq, 1397–1399, son of Tīmūr Beg, the son of Qutluq-Tīmūr, the son of Numqan, the son of Abay, the son of Kay-Timur, the son of Tuqa-Timur (3c); cousin, not son of Timur Malik (K/S19); real power was exercised by Edigu, who enthroned Tīmūr Qutluq after Tokhtamysh's defeat.
T2a Tokhtamysh, 1397, briefly restored, then expelled; rival khan in Sibir until death in 1406.
T3 Shādī Beg, 1399–1407, son of Qutlu-Beg, son of Qutluq-Tīmūr, the son of Numqan, the son of Abay, the son of Kay-Timur, the son of Tuqa-Timur (3c); cousin, not brother of Tīmūr Qutluq (T2); protégé of Edigu, fled to Shirvan.
T4 Pūlād, 1407–1410, son of Tīmūr Qutluq (T2); cousin, not son of Shādī Beg; protégé of Edigu, expelled.
T5 Karīm Berdi, 1409, son of Tokhtamysh (T1), seized Sarai, expelled.
T6 Pūlād, 1407–1410: 2nd reign; recalled Edigu from siege of Moscow.
T7 Tīmūr, 1410–1412, son of Tīmūr Qutluq (T2); overthrew Edigu, expelled and killed.
T8 Jalāl ad-Dīn, 1411–1412, eldest son of Tokhtamysh (T1), expelled and killed Tīmūr (T7), Lithuanian protégé, murdered by a brother.
T9 Karīm Berdi, 1412–1413: 2nd reign; anti-Lithuanian, killed pro-Lithuanian rival khan "Betsabul" = ? Kebek (T10); deposed.
T10 Kebek (= ? "Betsabul"), 1414, son of Tokhtamysh (T1), Lithuanian protégé, killed.
T11 Karīm Berdi, 1414: 3rd reign; deposed, killed by brother Jabbār Berdi (T12/14) in 1417?
T12 Jabbār Berdi, 1414–1415, son of Tokhtamysh (T1), Lithuanian protégé, deposed.
T13 Chekre, 1415–1416, son of Aqmil, the son of Minkasar, the son of Abay, the son of Kay-Timur, the son of Tuqa-Timur (3c); he and servant Johann Schiltberger went to Siberia with Edigu (earliest European report of Siberia); protégé of Edigu from 1414 as competitor to Kebek (T10), reigned 9 months, interrupting reign of Jabbār Berdi (T12/14), expelled or killed.
T14 Jabbār Berdi, 1416–1417: 2nd reign; deposed and killed.
T15 Sayyid Aḥmad (I), 1417, protégé of Edigu, inexperienced, deposed after 45 days? Either son of Karīm Berdi (T5/9/11) and thus grandson, not son of Tokhtamysh (T1), or cousin of Chekre (T13), as son of Mamkī, the son of Minkasar.
T15a Ghiyāth ad-Dīn I, 1416, son of Tāsh Tīmūr (T1b); Lithuanian protégé, killed against Sayyid Aḥmad (T15).
T16 Darwīsh, 1417–1419, son of Alti Qurtuqa, the son of Mamkī, the son of Minkasar; protégé of Edigu, killed?
T17 Qādir Berdi, 1419, son of Tokhtamysh (T1), killed against Edigu, who also perished.
T17a Beg Ṣūfī, 1419–1421, enthroned by Edigu as competitor to Qādir Berdi (T17), later Lithuanian protégéin the Crimea. Either son of Tāsh Tīmūr (T1b), or son of Beg Tūt, the son of Dānishmand, the son of Bayan, the son of Tuqa Timur (3c).
T18 Ḥājjī Muḥammad, 1419–1423, son of ʿAlī, the brother of Ḥasan Beg (27G), a descendant of Shiban (3b); protégé of Edigu's son Manṣūr, killed by Barāq (T19). Note: there is much confusion between at least three khans competing for power in this period, all named Muḥammad and not always sufficiently distinguished from each other in the sources: Ḥājjī Muḥammad (T18), (Muḥammad) Barāq (T19), and Ulugh Muḥammad (T21/23).
T19 Barāq, 1423–1425, son of Quyurchuq (T1a); Timurid protégé in the east since 1419, expelled by Ghiyāth ad-Dīn II (T20) 1425, defeated by Ulugh Muḥammad (T21) 1426 and expelled from Sarai, but retained control in the east (where he defeated the Timurid Ulugh Beg but was contained by Shah Rukh) until killed against (apparently) Küchük Muḥammad (T24) in 1428. Father of Jānī-Beg Abū-Saʿīd, the ancestor of Kazakh khans.
T19a Khudāydād, rival khan 1422–1424, son of ʿAli, the brother of Tāsh Tīmūr (T1b); anti-Lithuanian; 1422 defeated by Barāq (T19), 1424 failed to take Odoyev, last mentioned 1425.
T20 Ghiyāth ad-Dīn II, 1425–1426, son of Shādī Beg (T3); rival khan at Azov 1421, later protégé of Edigu's son Manṣūr from 1423, expelled by Ulugh Muḥammad (T21) in 1426, ensconced at Kazan, briefly ruler at Sarai in 1437.
T21 Ulugh Muḥammad, 1426–1428, son of Ḥasan, the brother of Tāsh Tīmūr (T1b); possibly set up by oppenents of Edigu's sons as early as 1419/1420; Lithuanian protégé in the Crimea 1424; expelled by Dawlat Berdi (T22) or Barāq (T19) in 1428 or 1427.
T22 Dawlat Berdi, 1428, son of Tāsh Tīmūr (T1b); Lithuanian protégé in the Crimea 1421–1424 and 1426–1428; expelled by Ulugh Muḥammad (T21/23) 1424, restored 1426, seized Sarai 1427 or 1428, died or killed later the same year.
T23 Ulugh Muḥammad, 1428–1436: 2nd reign; recovered Sarai 1427 or 1428; defeated Sayyid Aḥmad I (II) in 1432, divided Golden Horde with Küchük Muḥammad (T24) in 1433 (keeping west), expelled by Sayyid Aḥmad I (II) (T24) in 1436, defeated Vasilij II Vasil'evič of Moscow in 1437, founded Khanate of Kazan 1438, besieged Moscow 1439, died 1445, allegedly killed by son Maḥmūd; another son, Qāsim, founded the Khanate of Kasimov.
T23a Jūmādaq, 1426–1428, son of Ṣūfī, the son of Bābā, the son of Suyūnch Bāy, the son of Suyūnch Tīmūr, the brother of Īl Beg (33G); khan in Sibir and the east.
T23b Maḥmūd Khwāja, 1428–1430, son of Qāghān Beg (36G); khan in Sibir and the east.
T23c Khiḍr, 1428–1429, son of Ibrāhīm, the brother of ʿArab Shāh (37G); khan in Sibir and the east.
T23d Abu'l-Khayr Khan, 1429–1431, son of Dawlat Shaykh, the brother of Khiḍr (T23c); khan in Sibir and the east, later founder of the Uzbek Khanate, died 1469.
T23e Maḥmūdāq, 1431–1464, son of Ḥājjī Muḥammad (T18); khan in Sibir and the east, his line continued as rulers of the Khanate of Sibir.
T24 Küchük Muḥammad, 1433–1459, son of Tīmūr (T7); claimant in east as protégé of Edigu's son Ghāzī since c. 1427, killed and replaced Barāq (T19) in 1428, divided Golden Horde with Ulugh Muḥammad (T21/23) in 1433 (getting Volga and the east) with Astrakhan, defeated Ulugh Muḥammad in 1437, took over Azov (as witnessed by Giosafat Barbaro and the Crimea 1438, ruled also between the Don and Kazakhstan steppe.
T25 Sayyid Aḥmad I (II), 1436–1452, son of Beg Ṣūfī (T17a); 1432 declared khan in the Crimea but defeated and captured by Ulugh Muḥammad (T21/23), sent as hostage to Lithuania, protégé of the Lithuanian faction of Švitrigaila 1433, expelled Ulugh Muḥammad 1436, ruled between the Dnieper and the Don, raided Russia, lost Crimea 1441, in 1452 attacked by Khan Ḥājjī Girāy I of Crimea (T25a), fled to Kiev, captured by Lithuanians and 'died miserably' at Kovno (in 1455/65?).
T25a Ḥājjī Girāy I, 1441–1466, son of Ghiyāth ad-Dīn I (T15a); rival khan intermittendly since 1428, founded Crimean Khanate.
T26 Maḥmūd, 1459–1471, son of Küchük Muḥammad (T24); at Astrakhan: often considered founder of the Khanate of Astrakhan (inherited by his son Qāsim), defeated by Ḥājjī Girāy I of Crimea (T25a) in 1465.
T27 Aḥmad, 1465–1481 son of Küchük Muḥammad (T24); at Sarai; warred with the Uzbeks and lost Russia in 1480, killed by Khan Ibāq of Sibir and the Nogais.
T28 Shaykh Aḥmad, 1481–1493 and 1494–1502, son of Aḥmad (T27); in association and/or competition with his brothers and cousins, briefly deposed in favor of Murtaḍā (T30), then restored, defeated and expelled by Manglī Girāy I of Crimea 1502, fled to Astrakhan, then Lithuania, where he was held captive, released 1527, briefly khan at Astrakhan, died 1528.
T29 Sayyid Aḥmad II (III), 1485–1502, son of Aḥmad (T27); rival of Shaykh Aḥmad (T28), overran the Crimea as associate of Murtaḍā (T30) 1486, became associate of Shaykh Aḥmad by 1490, until they quarreled in 1501, last mentioned 1504.
T30 Murtaḍā, 1486–1494, son of Aḥmad (T27); rival of Shaykh Aḥmad (T28) as associate of Sayyid Aḥmad II (III) (T29), then on his own, briefly displaced Shaykh Aḥmad in 1493–1494, deposed; also in Astrakhan, died 1499 or after 1514.
Sack of Sarai by Khan Manglī Girāy I of Crimea in 1502: end of the "Great Horde"; overall, the Golden Horde had already disintegrated in the 1420s–1460s.

References

Citations

Sources 

 Baumer, C., The History of Central Asia. Vol. 3: The Age of Islam and the Mongols. London, 2016.
 Biran, M., Qaidu and the Rise of the Independent Mongol State in Central Asia, Richmond, Surrey, 1997.
 Bosworth, C. E., The New Islamic Dynasties, New York, 1996.
 Gaev, A. G., "Genealogija i hronologija Džučidov," Numizmatičeskij sbornik 3 (2002) 9-55.
 Grigor'ev, A. P., "Zolotoordynskie hany 60-70-h godov XIV v.: hronologija pravlenii," Istriografija i istočnikovedenie stran Azii i Afriki 7 (1983) 9-54.
 Hammer-Purgstall, J. von, Geschichte der Goldenen horde in Kiptschak, das ist: der Mongolen in Russland, Pest, 1840.
 Howorth, H. H., History of the Mongols from the 9th to the 19th Century. Part II.1. London, 1880.
 Kafalı, M., Altın Ordu Hanlığının Kuruluş ve Yükseliş Devirleri, İstanbul, 1976.
 May, T., "Color Symbolism in the Turco-Mongol World," in S. Kim (ed.), The Use of Color in History, Politics, and Art, Dahlonega, GA, 2016: 51-78.
 May, T., The Mongol Empire. Edinburgh, 2018.
 Parunin, A. V., "Imperator Solkatskij Bek-Sufi," Istoričeskij format 4 (2016) 159-168.
 Počekaev, R. J., Cari ordynskie: Biografii hanov i pravitelej Zolotoj Ordy. Saint Petersburg, 2010.
 Reva, R., "Borba za vlast' v pervoj polovine XV v.," in Zolotaja Orda v mirovoj istorii, Kazan', 2016: 704-729.
 Sabitov, Ž. M., Genealogija "Tore", Astana, 2008.
 Sabitov, Ž. M., "K voprosu o genealogijah potomkov Orda-ičena XIV veka," Zolotoordynskaja civilizacija 7 (2014) 41-53.
 Sabitov, Ž. M., "Političeskaja istorija ulusa Džuči v 1256–1263 godah," Zolotoordynskoe obozrenie 2 (2015) 51-64.
 Sidorenko, V. A., "Hronologija pravlenii zolotoordynskih hanov 1357-1380 gg.," Materialov po arheologii, istorii i ètnografii Tavrii 7 (2000) 267-288.
 Vásáry, I., "The beginnings of coinage in the Blue Horde," Acta Orientalia Academiae Scientiarum Hungaricae 62 (2009) 371-385.
 Vohidov, Š. H. (trans.), Istorija Kazahstana v persidskih istočnikah. 3. Muʿizz al-ansāb. Almaty, 2006.

Khans of the Golden Horde
Golden